The 1917–18 Yale Bulldogs men's ice hockey season was the 23rd season of play for the program.

Season
With many of the University's students having left to join the military for the Great War, Yale only fielded an informal team. The team was attached to the school's ROTC and possessed none of the regulars from the previous year. Lester Armour was elected team captain at the end of the previous season, but as he did not play during this season that title was only honorific.

Predictably, Yale had difficulty scheduling games and would play only a single game all season. They visited YMCA College in early February, winning 7–2 with four players from last season's championship freshman team on the roster.

Yale would eventually recognize the 1917–18 team as an official representative of the university, which allows the program to claim an uninterrupted existence since 1895–96.

Roster

Standings

Schedule and Results

|-
!colspan=12 style="color:white; background:#00356B" | Regular Season

References

Yale Bulldogs men's ice hockey seasons
Yale
Yale
Yale
Yale